Daniel "Danny" Rotman (born 1932) is a professional American bridge player from Aventura, Florida.

Rotman is a retired businessman and graduated from Bradley University.

Bridge accomplishments

Wins

 North American Bridge Championships (6)
 von Zedtwitz Life Master Pairs (1) 1959 
 Grand National Teams (1) 1978 
 Mitchell Board-a-Match Teams (1) 1985 
 Chicago Mixed Board-a-Match (2) 1969, 1988 
 Spingold (1) 1987

Runners-up

 North American Bridge Championships
 Silodor Open Pairs (2) 1963, 1973 
 Vanderbilt (1) 1989 
 Keohane North American Swiss Teams (1) 1992 
 Mitchell Board-a-Match Teams (1) 1965 
 Reisinger (1) 1967

Notes

External links
 

American contract bridge players
Living people
1932 births
Place of birth missing (living people)
Date of birth missing (living people)
People from Aventura, Florida
Bradley University alumni